Greg Babinec (born June 24, 1962) is an American politician who served in the Oklahoma House of Representatives from the 33rd district from 2016 to 2018. On June 26, 2018, he was defeated in the Republican primary for the 33rd district.

References

1962 births
Living people
Republican Party members of the Oklahoma House of Representatives